The 1920–21 Scottish Cup was the 43rd staging of Scotland's most prestigious football knockout competition. The Cup was won for the first time in their history by Partick Thistle who defeated Rangers in the final. Thistle played 11 matches in their cup run. The defending champions Kilmarnock were defeated in the second round by Aberdeen.

Second round
Partick Thistle had two goalless draws with Hibernian - the first at Easter Road and the second at Firhill in front of 25,000 fans, before a single goal from MacFarlane, who played no part in the final, saw off the Hibs in the 2nd replay. The second replay on Tuesday 21 February 1921 at Parkhead, Glasgow had an attendance of over 20,000 on a wet and stormy day. MacFarlane's second half goal was a header scored from a free-kick. Shortly afterwards the centre forward had a penalty saved by Hibs goalie Harper.

Third round
Partick Thistle beat East Stirlingshire 2-0 with Jimmy Kinloch scoring both goals.

Fourth round

Semi-finals

Replays

Second replays

Final

The match was dubbed the 'Boycott Final' after the Scottish Football Association raised the admission price from one shilling to two shillings. It was also played in the midst of a miners' strike.

Teams

See also
1920–21 in Scottish football
1930 Scottish Cup Final (between same teams)

References

Scottish Cup seasons
Scottish
Cup